USA-166, also known as GPS IIR-8 and GPS SVN-56, is an American navigation satellite which forms part of the Global Positioning System. It was the eighth Block IIR GPS satellite to be launched, out of thirteen in the original configuration, and twenty one overall. It was built by Lockheed Martin, using the AS-4000 satellite bus.

USA-166 was launched at 18:06:00 UTC on 29 January 2003, atop a Delta II carrier rocket, flight number D295, flying in the 7925-9.5 configuration. The XSS-10 satellite was carried as a secondary payload on the same rocket, but was deployed from the second stage of the three-stage rocket. The launch took place from Space Launch Complex 17B at the Cape Canaveral Air Force Station, and placed USA-166 into a transfer orbit. The satellite raised itself into medium Earth orbit using a Star-37FM apogee motor.

It is used to broadcast the PRN 16 signal, and operates in slot 1 of plane B of the GPS constellation. As of 2012 it remains in service.

References

Spacecraft launched in 2003
GPS satellites
USA satellites